The 2001 Peach Bowl featured the North Carolina Tar Heels and Auburn Tigers.

Background
North Carolina, in the first season under new head coach John Bunting, started their season by losing the first three games of the year. However, they rebounded with five wins in a row (which included wins over #6 Florida State and #13 Clemson). This was followed by losses to #23 Georgia Tech (while ranked) and Wake Forest before closing out the regular season with two straight wins. This was the first bowl appearance for North Carolina in three years along with their fifth appearance in the Peach Bowl. The Tigers won six of their first seven games, which included a win over #1 ranked Florida. However, after being ranked #17, they would lose three of their next four games, with a December loss to LSU costing them the chance to a second straight SEC Championship Game. This was their third ever appearance in the Peach Bowl.

Game summary
North Carolina scored on a 10-yard Willie Parker touchdown run, as UNC led 7–0 after one quarter of play. In the second quarter, Jeff Reed kicked a 22-yard field goal, extending North Carolina's lead to 10–0. In the third quarter, quarterback Ronald Curry scored on a 62-yard touchdown run giving North Carolina a 16–0 lead. In the fourth quarter, Damon Duval kicked a 34-yard field goal, and Daniel Cobb threw a 12-yard touchdown pass to Lorenzo Diamond, as Auburn made the final score 16–10.

Statistical leaders
Passing
 North Carolina: Darian Durant: 7-of-14, 76 yards, one interception
 Auburn: Jason Campbell: 12-of-18, 74 yards

Rushing
 North Carolina: Willie Parker: 19 carries, 131 rush yds
 Auburn: Ronnie Brown: 6 carries, 28 yards

References

Peach Bowl
Peach Bowl
North Carolina Tar Heels football bowl games
Auburn Tigers football bowl games
Peach Bowl
December 2001 sports events in the United States
2001 in Atlanta